Oryzaephilus genalis, is a species of silvan flat bark beetle native to India and Sri Lanka.

Description
Total length of the species is about 2.55 mm. Length of elytra is 1.67 mm. The species is closely resembles Oryzaephilus surinamensis. Antennal joints of 6 to 8 are elongated. Head with lateral sides of frons are slightly more elevated. Body elongated, slightly depressed. Dorsal surface is blackish brown covered with short, semi-erect, golden pubescence. In the head, there are two shallow depressions on frons. Vertex puncturation coarse and dense. Antenna moderately long and slender, with a larger scape. Prothorax is elongated and convex. Longitudinal carinae on pronotal disc normally elevated and longitudinal grooves are well-marked. Scutellum large and transverse. Elytral apex is slightly forked, where the setae projected posteriorly.

References 

Silvanidae
Insects of Sri Lanka
Insects of India
Insects described in 1980